Conglomerate is a record label founded by Busta Rhymes. The label was established in 1994 as Flipmode, the name Conglomerate was later adopted in 2010.

Company history

Elektra (1996–2000)
Soon after the Elektra deal was done, Busta obtained his own label which was to serve as an imprint to Elektra. At the time, his new artist Rah Digga signed to Elektra, along with her cousin Rampage. Elektra would allow Busta to sign these acts to his Flipmode Entertainment. Under the terms of the deal, Busta was responsible for putting their albums together and they would fund, promote and distribute the releases from the label. The first release from Flipmode was Busta Rhymes' The Coming, which came in 1996, during the time that the east coast was beginning to gain popularity again after the rise of the west coast. The album went platinum and catapulted him and the label into stardom, it also featured appearances from coming Flipmode members Spliff Star, Lord Have Mercy, and Rampage. Rampage would release his debut album in 1997, along with Busta Rhymes' second album. The crew was forming all the while Rampage, Rah Digga, Busta, Spliff Star, and Lord Have Mercy would soon be joined by Baby Sham, as well. The label soon released an album by Flipmode Squad, The Imperial in 1998. By 1999, the group and label were one of the most popular crews in hip hop, with Busta Rhymes as their central star and leader. Despite this, Busta was looking for a change as he was disappointed with the way that Elektra handled his last project and Rah Digga's debut, Dirty Harriet, which sold poorly, though the album would later become something of a cult classic. After the release of his album, Anarchy, Busta began looking for a way to move him and his squad to another label, but had only released four out of the five albums in his deal with Warner Bros. Records. So, in 2000, he released a compilation album and began to search for a new home. By then, member Lord Have Mercy would part ways with the crew, signaling the end of the height of Flipmode as a crew, as his album The Ungodly Hour never saw the light of day. Future changes would plague the group due to tense chemistry with Busta.

J (2001–2004)
After he moved the label away from Elektra, Busta had begun talking to Clive Davis, who had been recently ousted from Arista Records. He mentioned to Busta that he had recently created a new imprint at BMG, J Records. Clive told Busta that he had yet to sign anyone to the label and would be glad to distribute Busta and his Flipmode Entertainment. The deal was done by November 2000 and Busta Rhymes began work on his fifth album, Genesis. The album sold well, fueled by the P. Diddy-collaborated "Pass the Courvoisier." The single was a big hit during the year of 2002 and introduced Busta Rhymes into a younger generation of fans and totally revitalized his career. After the hype surrounding Genesis died down, Busta began working on an album for his Flipmode Squad, Rah Digga, and himself. The first to be released was It Ain't Safe No More, which featured Mariah Carey and the Flipmode Squad. Two singles from the album got a lot of airplay, but his new solo album stalled at gold, making it the worst-selling album in Busta Rhymes discography. To this Busta would blame on J Records not promoting his music properly, and consequently J records did not release Rah Digga's album nor did they release the Flipmode group album. In turn, Busta began associating himself with Dr. Dre and Eminem, as rumors began to circulate that Busta was moving his label yet again. These rumors proved to be false at the time. He would record some songs with Eminem and Dr. Dre, but would continue to stay at J Records. From 2002 to 2004, nothing was heard from Flipmode Entertainment as Busta Rhymes, the face of their label was doing more television than anything else. They resurfaced in 2005, when Busta Rhymes announced that he was planning to leave J Records and was recording his seventh album. Consequently, a new Flipmode album, though in the works, was shelved, and the roster continued to change.

Aftermath and Interscope (2006–2008)
In late 2005, Busta Rhymes had moved Flipmode once again, this time to Dr. Dre's Aftermath Entertainment, a subsidiary of powerhouse label, Interscope Records. He celebrated the new distribution deal by cutting off his trademark dreadlocks and signing hip hop phenom, Papoose and Chauncey Black, formerly of Blackstreet. The deal came as no surprise to any hip hop fan as Dr. Dre had been producing for Busta since he had been signed to Elektra and he had begun to be featured on many Shady/Aftermath projects during the years 2003 and 2004. In February 2006, he released the second single, "I Love My Chick" from his seventh studio album The Big Bang. The album was released on June 13, 2006. It was a platinum success and returned the label back to the radio and back to hip hop prominence after a four-year absence. This success would be short-lived as the label's next release, Have You Seen by Rampage failed to certify on the charts. Soon after, the label would run into more bad luck. Papoose, who was signed to a joint-venture with Streetsweepers Entertainment, announced that he was leaving Flipmode just after signing a $1 Million dollar contract with the label. Furthermore, longtime Flipmode Entertainment act Rah Digga left the label expressing her full frustration to the fact of her new solo material never being released. On July 17, 2008, Busta Rhymes got dropped from Interscope/Aftermath, however. It was reported that Busta Rhymes was dropped from Interscope due to a heated argument with Jimmy Iovine. It was later revealed that following his alleged acrimonious departure from the Interscope/Aftermath label he signed a new deal with Universal Motown, who would be releasing his 8th studio album Back on My B.S. on May 19, 2009.

Universal Motown and Conglomerate (2008–2009)
Smith released his eighth studio album Back on My B.S. on May 19, 2009, via Universal Motown. The album debuted at No. 5 on the Billboard 200, selling 56,000 copies, and was his first album to not receive an RIAA certification, selling 122,000 copies to date. The singles that have been released from the album are, "Arab Money", "Hustler's Anthem '09" and "Respect My Conglomerate". The song "World Go Round", featuring British singer Estelle, was released in France on April 6, 2009, due to the heavy rotation of a leaked version.  The single was released in the UK on July 13, 2009. All the while, the Flipmode roster continued to change, and Spliff Star dropped a number of street albums, with the collective recording mixtapes. 
 
Busta Rhymes then founded The Conglomerate Entertainment in 2010 and the brand is no longer known as Flipmode.

Conglomerate (2010–present)

On November 16, 2011, it was announced that Busta Rhymes signed to Cash Money Records. For his debut single on the label and his The Conglomerate Entertainment, "Why Stop Now", he reunited with his "Look at Me Now"-collaborator Chris Brown.

The Conglomerate, as a collective effort, released their first official mixtape 'Catastrophic' at the end of 2012. On July 24, 2014, Reek da Villian revealed that he had departed from Conglomerate Records.

Artists

Current acts
 Busta Rhymes
 Spliff Star
 J-Doe
 O.T. Genasis
 Murda Mook
 Prayah
 Trillian
 Dj Scratch-a-tor

Former acts
 Lord Have Mercy
 Roc Marciano
 Rah Digga
 Baby Sham
 Rampage
 Chauncey Black
 Flipmode Squad
Papoose
 Labba
 Show Money
 Jelly Roll
 Reek da Villian
 N.O.R.E.
 M.Dollars
Stove God Cooks
 Serious

Discography

See also 
 List of record labels

References 

American record labels
Record labels established in 1994
Hip hop record labels
Vanity record labels